Nanomonadea is a class of biciliate phagotrophic, non-photosynthetic free-living opalozoans, coontaining the sole order Uniciliatida. This monophyletic group previously known as clade MAST-3 is characterized by a single hairless posterior cilium and absence of an anterior cilium.

Phylogeny
The cladogram below shows the relationships between Nanomonadea and the rest of Opalozoans.

Taxonomy
The taxonomy of Nanomonadea is as follows:
Subphylum Opalozoa 
Infraphylum Placidozoa 
Superclass Wobblata  (paraphyletic)
Class Nanomonadea 
Order Uniciliatida 
Family Solenicolidae  – Solenicola
Family Incisomonadidae  – Incisomonas

References

Placidozoa